Nikolai Kazakovtsev (born March 23, 1990) is a Russian professional ice hockey forward who is currently an unrestricted free agent. He previously played the entirety of his career with the Severstal Cherepovets of the Kontinental Hockey League (KHL).

References

External links 

1990 births
Living people
Severstal Cherepovets players
Russian ice hockey forwards